Central Bangka Regency is a regency (kabupaten) of the Bangka Belitung Islands Province, Indonesia. It covers an area of 2,155.77 km2 and had a population of 161,075 at the 2010 Census, rising to 198,946 at the 2020 Census. The town of Koba is its regency seat.

Administrative Districts
The table also includes the numbers of administrative villages (rural desa and urban kelurahan) and offshore islands in each district, and its postal code.

Notes: (a) includes 8 offshore islands. (b) includes 3 offshore islands. (c) includes 6 offshore islands.

References

External links 

 

Regencies of Bangka Belitung Islands